Prasinocyma semicrocea, the common gum emerald, is a moth of the family Geometridae. The species was first described by Francis Walker in 1861. It is found in Australia.

References

Moths described in 1861
Geometrinae